Qala Wust (name variants: Kala Wust, Ūst,  Qal‘ah-ye Ūst (BGN standard), Qal‘a-i-Ūst,  Qala Ust, Qala Yost, Qal‘eh-ye Vost) is a mountain village in the Wakhan region of the Badakhshan Province, north-eastern Afghanistan.

Qala Wust is a settlement of Tajik highlanders.

The village gave names to the Qala Wust Valley, Qala Wust Gneiss formation, and made a former name (Koh-i Qala-i Ust; koh-i means "mountain of") of the Kohanha massif.

See also
Badakhshan Province

References

Populated places in Badakhshan Province
Wakhan